Louvil is a commune in the Nord department in northern France.

Heraldry

See also
 Communes of the Nord department

References

Communes of Nord (French department)
French Flanders